Love Canal is a neighborhood in Niagara Falls, New York, United States, infamous as the location of a  landfill that became the site of an enormous environmental disaster in the 1970s. Decades of dumping toxic chemicals harmed the health of hundreds of residents; the area was cleaned up over the course of 21 years in a Superfund operation.

In 1890, Love Canal was created as a model planned community, but was only partially developed. In the 1920s, the canal became a dump site for municipal refuse for the city of Niagara Falls. During the 1940s, the canal was purchased by Hooker Chemical Company, which used the site to dump  of chemical byproducts from the manufacturing of dyes, perfumes, and solvents for rubber and synthetic resins.

Love Canal was sold to the local school district in 1953, after the threat of eminent domain. Over the next three decades, it attracted national attention for the public health problems originating from the former dumping of toxic waste on the grounds. This event displaced numerous families, leaving them with longstanding health issues and symptoms of high white blood cell counts and leukemia. Subsequently, the federal government passed the Superfund law. The resulting Superfund cleanup operation demolished the neighborhood, ending in 2004.

In 1988, New York State Department of Health Commissioner David Axelrod called the Love Canal incident a "national symbol of a failure to exercise a sense of concern for future generations".  The Love Canal incident was especially significant as a situation where the inhabitants "overflowed into the wastes instead of the other way around". The University at Buffalo Archives house a number of primary documents, photographs, and news clippings pertaining to the Love Canal environmental disaster; many items have been digitized and are viewable online.

Geography 
Love Canal is a neighborhood located in the city of Niagara Falls in the northwestern region of New York state. The neighborhood covers 36 blocks in the far southeastern corner of the city, stretching from 93rd Street comprising the western border to 100th Street in the east border and 103rd Street in the northeast. The LaSalle Expressway splits an uninhabited portion of the south from the north.

Early history
In 1890, William T. Love, a former railroad lawyer, prepared plans to construct a preplanned urban community of parks and residences on the shore of Lake Ontario. Love, who would become notorious for similar real-estate schemes later in life, claimed it would serve the area's burgeoning industries with much-needed hydroelectricity. He named the project Model City, New York.

After 1892, Love's plan incorporated a shipping lane that would bypass Niagara Falls. He arranged backing from financial banks in New York City, Chicago, and England. During October 1893, the first factory opened for business. In May 1894, work on the canal began. Steel companies and other manufacturers expressed interest in opening plants along Love Canal. Love began having a canal dug and built a few streets and houses.

The Panic of 1893 caused investors to end sponsorship of the project. Then in 1906, environmental groups successfully lobbied Congress to pass a law, designed to preserve Niagara Falls, prohibiting the removal of water from the Niagara River.

The Panic of 1907 combined with the development of the transmission of electrical power over great distances, creating access to hydroelectric power far from water sources, proved disastrous for what remained of the Model City plan. The last piece of property owned by Love's corporation was lost to foreclosure and sold at public auction in 1910. By that point, Love himself was long gone; in 1897 he left the United States for England, before returning to attempt similar schemes in Washington, Illinois, and Delaware.

With the project abandoned, the canal gradually filled with water. Local children swam there during summers and skated during the winters. In the 1920s, the city of Niagara Falls used the canal as a municipal landfill.

Industry and tourism increased steadily throughout the first half of the 20th century due to a great demand for industrial products and the increased mobility of people to travel. Paper, rubber, plastics, petrochemicals, carbon insulators, and abrasives composed the city's major industries.

At the time of the dump's closure in 1952, Niagara Falls was experiencing prosperity, and the population had been expanding dramatically, growing by 31% in twenty years (1940–1960) from 78,020 to 102,394.

Hooker Chemical Company 
By the end of the 1940s, Hooker Chemical Company was searching for a place to dispose its large quantity of chemical waste. The Niagara Power and Development Company granted permission to Hooker during 1942 to dump wastes into the canal. The canal was drained and lined with thick clay. Into this site, Hooker began placing  drums. In 1947, Hooker bought the canal and the  banks on either side of the canal. It subsequently converted it into a  landfill.

In 1948, the City of Niagara Falls ended self-sufficient disposal of refuse and Hooker Chemical became the sole user and owner of the site.

In early 1952, when it became apparent that the site would likely be developed for construction, Hooker ceased use of Love Canal as a dumpsite. Upon its closure, the canal was covered with a clay seal to prevent leakage. Over time, vegetation settled and began to grow atop the dump site.

By the 1950s, the city of Niagara Falls was experiencing a population increase. With a growing population, the Niagara Falls City School District needed land to build new schools and attempted to purchase the property from Hooker Chemical. The population reached more than 98,000 by the 1950 census.

Sale of the site 
During March 1951, the school board prepared a plan showing a school being built over the canal and listing condemnation values for each property that would need to be acquired. During March 1952, the superintendent of Niagara Falls School Board inquired of Hooker with regard to purchasing the Love Canal property for the purpose of constructing a new school. After this, in an internal company memorandum dated March 27, 1952, Bjarne Klaussen, Hooker's vice president, wrote to the works manager that "it may be advisable to discontinue using the Love Canal property for a dumping ground." During April 1952, after discussing the sale of the land with Ansley Wilcox II, Hooker's in-house legal counsel, Klaussen then wrote to the company president, R.L. Murray, suggesting that the sale could alleviate them from future liabilities for the buried chemicals:

While the school board condemned some nearby properties, Hooker agreed to sell its property to the school board for $1. Hooker's letter to the board agreeing to enter into negotiations noted that "in view of the nature of the property and the purposes for which it has been used, it will be necessary for us to have special provisions incorporated into the deed with respect to the use of the property and other pertinent matters." The board rejected the company's proposal that the deed require the land to be used for park purposes only, with the school itself to be built nearby.

As "a means of avoiding liability by relinquishing control of the site", Hooker deeded the site to the school board in 1953 for $1 with a liability limitation clause. The sale document signed on April 28, 1953, included a seventeen-line caveat purporting to release the company from all legal obligations should lawsuits occur during the future.

Critics of Hooker's actions believe that, in the words of Craig E. Colton and Peter N. Skinner, "Hooker assigned the board with a continuing duty to protect property buyers from chemicals when the company itself accepted no such 'moral obligation'." The transfer effectively ended what provision of security and maintenance for the hazardous waste had existed before and placed all responsibility in clearly unqualified hands. It was this attempt to evade their responsibility, Colten and Skinner contend, that would "ultimately come back to haunt not only Hooker but all other chemical producers in the United States through the strict liability provisions of Superfund legislation." However, Eric Zeusse writes that Hooker's decision to sell the property rather than allowing the school board to condemn it stemmed from a desire to document its warnings. "Had the land been condemned and seized, says Hooker, the company would have been unable to air its concerns to all future owners of the property. It is difficult to see any other reason for what it did."

Not long after having taken control of the land, the Niagara Falls School Board proceeded to develop the land, including construction activity that substantially breached containment structures in a number of ways, allowing previously trapped chemicals to seep out.

The resulting breaches combined with particularly heavy rainstorms released and spread the chemical waste, resulting in a public health emergency and an urban planning scandal. In what became a test case for liability clauses, Hooker Chemical was found to be "negligent" in their disposal of waste, though not reckless in the sale of the land. The dumpsite was discovered and investigated by the local newspaper, the Niagara Falls Gazette, from 1976 through the evacuation in 1978.

Construction of the 93rd Street School and the 99th Street School 
Despite the disclaimer, the School Board began construction of the "99th Street School" in its originally intended location. In January 1954, the school's architect wrote to the education committee informing them that during excavation, workers discovered two dump sites filled with  drums containing chemical wastes. The architect also noted it would be "poor policy" to build in that area since it was not known what wastes were present in the ground, and the concrete foundation might be damaged. The school board then relocated the school site  further north. The kindergarten playground also had to be relocated because it was directly on top of a chemical dump.

Upon completion in 1955, 400 children attended the school, and it opened along with several other schools that had been built to accommodate students. That same year, a twenty-five-foot area crumbled exposing toxic chemical drums, which then filled with water during rainstorms. This created large puddles that children enjoyed playing in. In 1955, a second school, the 93rd Street School, was opened six blocks away.

School district sells land for home construction 
The school district sold the remaining land, resulting in homes being constructed by private developers, as well as the Niagara Falls Housing Authority.  The sale came despite the warning of a Hooker attorney, Arthur Chambers, that, as paraphrased in the minutes of a board meeting, due to chemical waste having been dumped in that area, the land was not suitable for construction where underground facilities would be necessary. He stated that his company could not prevent the Board from selling the land or from doing anything they wanted to with it but it was their intent that this property be used for a school and for parking. He further stated that they feel the property should not be divided for the purpose of building homes and hoped that no one will be injured.

During 1957, the City of Niagara Falls constructed sewers for a mixture of low-income and single family residences to be built on lands adjacent to the landfill site.  While building the gravel sewer beds, construction crews broke through the clay seal, breaching the canal walls. Specifically, the local government removed part of the protective clay cap to use as fill dirt for the nearby 93rd Street School, and punched holes in the solid clay walls to build water lines and the LaSalle Expressway. This allowed the toxic wastes to escape when rainwater, no longer kept out by the partially removed clay cap, washed them through the gaps in the walls. Hence, the buried chemicals could migrate and seep from the canal.

The land where the homes were being built was not part of the agreement between the school board and Hooker; thus, none of these residents knew the canal's history. There was no monitoring or evaluating of the chemical wastes stored under the ground. Additionally, the clay cover of the canal which was supposed to be impermeable began to crack. The subsequent construction of the LaSalle Expressway restricted groundwater from flowing to the Niagara River. After the exceptionally wet winter and spring of 1962, the elevated expressway turned the breached canal into an overflowing pool. People reported having puddles of oil or colored liquid in yards or basements.

By the 1970s, the Love Canal area was an established suburban community that appealed to commuters and families. It was proximate to the school and newly constructed churches, it was conveniently located just a few miles from the city center, and the expressway provided access to shopping and leisure opportunities. Census data revealed the area had a higher than median income, and the majority of its households included young children. Due to the great percentage of new construction in the area, less than 3% of housing units were unoccupied. In 1976, a report evaluating Niagara Falls ranked Love Canal the fourth-best area in "social well-being." In total, 800 private houses and 240 low-income apartments were constructed. Before the public revelation of the environmental crisis, developers were planning to expand the area with additional homes. There were 410 children in the school during 1978.

Lead-up and discovery 
Residents were suspicious of black fluid that flowed out of the Love Canal. For years, residents had complained about odors and substances in their yards or the public playgrounds. Finally the city acted and hired a consultant, Calspan Corporation, to do a far-reaching study. In 1977, a harsh winter storm dumped  of snow, significantly raising the water table. The excess water got into the ground water and raised the elevation of contaminants including dioxin. During the spring of 1977, the State Departments of Health and Environmental Conservation began an intensive air, soil, and groundwater sampling and analysis program after qualitative identification of a number of organic compounds in the basements of 11 homes adjacent to the Love Canal. It was also revealed that the standards at the time did not require the installation of a liner to prevent leaching; this became very common among companies.

Contaminants 
Numerous contaminants dumped in the landfill included chlorinated hydrocarbon residues, processed sludge, fly ash, and other materials, including residential municipal garbage.

Data showed unacceptable levels of toxic vapors associated with more than 80 compounds were emanating from the basements of numerous homes in the first ring directly adjacent to the Love Canal. Ten of the most prevalent and most toxic compounds - including benzene, a known human carcinogen - were selected for evaluation purposes and as indicators of the presence of other chemical constituents.

Laboratory analyses of soil and sediment samples from the Love Canal indicate the presence of more than 200 distinct organic chemical compounds; approximately 100 of these have been identified to date.

Numerous other chemicals seeped through the ground. Some of the chemicals and toxic materials found included benzene, chloroform, toluene, dioxin, and various kinds of PCB.

Health effects 
At first, scientific studies did not conclusively prove the chemicals were responsible for the residents' illnesses yet scientists were divided on the issue, even though eleven known or suspected carcinogens had been identified, one of the most prevalent being benzene. Also present was dioxin (polychlorinated dibenzodioxins) in the water, a very hazardous substance. Dioxin pollution is usually measured in parts per trillion; at Love Canal, water samples showed dioxin levels of 53 parts per billion (53,000 parts per trillion). Geologists were recruited to determine whether underground swales were responsible for carrying the chemicals to the surrounding residential areas. Once there, chemicals could leach into basements and evaporate into household air.

In 1979, the EPA announced the result of blood tests which showed high white blood cell counts, a precursor to leukemia, and chromosome damage in Love Canal residents. 33% of the residents had undergone chromosomal damage. In a typical population, chromosomal damage affects 1% of people. Other studies were unable to find harm. The United States National Research Council (NRC) surveyed Love Canal health studies during 1991. The NRC noted the major exposure of concern was the groundwater rather than drinking water; the groundwater "seeped into basements" and then resulted in exposure through air and soil. Several studies reported higher levels of low-birth weight babies and birth defects among the exposed residents with some evidence the effect subsided after the exposure was eliminated. The National Research Council also noted a study which found exposed children were found to have an "excess of seizures, learning problems, hyperactivity, eye irritation, skin rashes, abdominal pain, and incontinence" and stunted growth. Voles in the area were found to have significantly increased mortality compared to controls (mean life expectancy in exposed animals "23.6 and 29.2 days, respectively, compared to 48.8 days" for control animals). New York State also has an ongoing health study of Love Canal residents. In that year, the Albert Elia Building Co., Inc., now Sevenson Environmental Services, Inc., was selected as the principal contractor to safely re-bury the toxic waste at the Love Canal Site.

According to the United States Environmental Protection Agency (EPA) in 1979, residents exhibited a "disturbingly high rate of miscarriages ... Love Canal can now be added to a growing list of environmental disasters involving toxics, ranging from industrial workers stricken by nervous disorders and cancers to the discovery of toxic materials in the milk of nursing mothers." In one case, two out of four children in a single Love Canal family had birth defects; one girl was born deaf with a cleft palate, an extra row of teeth, and slight retardation, and a boy was born with an eye defect.

Awareness 

In 1976, two reporters for the Niagara Falls Gazette, David Pollak and David Russell, tested several sump pumps near Love Canal and found toxic chemicals in them. The Gazette published reports, once in October 1976 and once in November 1976, of chemical analyses of residues near the old Love Canal dumpsite indicated presence of 15 organic chemicals, including three toxic chlorinated hydrocarbons. The matter became quiet for more than a year and was then revived by reporter Michael Brown, who then investigated potential health effects by performing an informal door-to-door survey during early 1978, writing a hundred news items on toxic wastes in the area and finding birth defects and many anomalies such as enlarged feet, heads, hands, and legs. He advised the local residents to create a protest group, which was organized by resident Karen Schroeder, whose daughter had many (about a dozen) birth defects. The New York State Health Department investigated and found an abnormal incidence of miscarriages.

Brown discovered the size of the canal, the presence of dioxin, the expanding contamination, and the involvement, to an extent, of the U.S. Army. Hooker threatened to sue him and he fought the firm for years, including on the Today Show. His book on toxic wastes, Laying Waste: The Poisoning of America By Toxic Chemicals, was the first written on the subject of toxic wastes and created a national firestorm, as did articles of his in The New York Times Magazine and The Atlantic Monthly. He also discovered a huge dump called the Hyde Park landfill (or Bloody Run) and the "S-Area," which was leaking into the water supply for Niagara Falls. His work inspired many activists. He spoke for ten years on the college lecture circuit.

Congressman John LaFalce (D), who represented the district, paid a high profile visit to Love Canal in September 1977, to raise attention to the serious problems. LaFalce intervened to get city, state and federal officials, and Hooker executives, involved to take quick action, but he was met with resistance, apathy and stalling.

By 1978, Love Canal had become a national media event with articles referring to the neighborhood as "a public health time bomb", and "one of the most appalling environmental tragedies in American history".  Brown, working for the local newspaper, the Niagara Gazette, is credited with not only revealing the case, but establishing toxic chemical wastes as a nationwide issue as well.  Brown's book, Laying Waste, examined the Love Canal disaster and many other toxic waste catastrophes nationwide.

The dumpsite was declared an unprecedented state of emergency on August 2, 1978. Brown, who wrote more than a hundred articles concerning the dump, tested the groundwater and later found the dump was three times larger than originally thought, with possible ramifications beyond the original evacuation zone. He was also to discover that toxic dioxins were there.

Activism tactics 
Activism at Love Canal was initially organized by community residents Tom Heiser and Lois Gibbs, with Lois Gibbs often serving as spokesperson.  Gibbs's strategies emphasized concerns for children and families of the affected area, with women taking the most prominent public and active roles. Many men also helped women in these efforts, though not always publicly. Men who were hesitant to oppose Hooker Chemical openly for example, were able to contribute to the movement through increased contributions to family labor in the absence of their activist wives.

In addition to community organizing and pressuring authorities for appropriate responses, direct-action forms of activism were employed.  Tactics included protests and rallies, which were intentionally timed and planned in an effort to maximize media attention.  Such events included "controversial" methods such as mothers protesting while pushing strollers, marching by pregnant women, and children holding protest signs. Notably, two EPA employees were also held hostage by activists for approximately five hours at the LCHA office, in order to bring their demands to the attention of the federal government.

Role of community organizations 

Numerous organizations were formed in response to the crisis at Love Canal, with members' activism emphasizing variously overlapping interests. In addition to the Love Canal Homeowners Association (LCHA), other major organizations involved included the Ecumenical Taskforce (ETF), National Association for the Advancement of Colored People (NAACP), and the Concerned Love Canal Renters Association (CLCRA). These organizations are often overlooked in the story of Love Canal, according to research by Elizabeth Blum in Love Canal Revisited.

The Ecumenical Taskforce (ETF) was a religious organization composed of volunteers from the surrounding area. In conjunction with other citizens' groups such as LCHA and LCARA, the ETF used their resources to promote environmental health and gender, class, and racial equality.

The NAACP became involved with the Love Canal issue after William Abrams Sr., president of the Niagara Falls chapter drew attention to his wife's fatal liver failure. Abrams's involvement drew attention to racial inequality present in the community and concerns about how this could affect comprehensive relocation efforts. Abrams contacted the regional NAACP director who announced that discrimination against minorities at Love Canal would be met with legal action. This involvement inspired additional support and activism, particularly on behalf of members of the renting community, many of whom were also members of the African-American and immigrant communities at the site.

Another subgroup of local residents formed the Concerned Love Canal Renters Association (CLCRA). This group's action sought to address the needs of the (largely, but not exclusively, African-American) renter community, whose interests were at times perceived to be in conflict with those of some members of the (predominantly white) property owners represented by the LCHA.

In 1980, Lois Gibbs established the Center for Health, Environment, and Justice as a continuation of her activism at Love Canal.

Lois Gibbs and the Love Canal Homeowners' Association 
On August 2, 1978, Lois Gibbs, a local mother who called an election to head the Love Canal Homeowners' Association, began to rally homeowners. Her son, Michael Gibbs, began attending school in September 1977. He developed epilepsy in December, suffered from asthma and a urinary tract infection, and had a low white blood cell count, all associated with his exposure to the leaking chemical waste. Gibbs had learned from Brown that her neighborhood sat atop the buried chemical waste.

During the following years, Gibbs organized an effort to investigate community concerns about the health of its residents. She and other residents made repeated complaints of strange odors and "substances" that surfaced in their yards. In Gibbs' neighborhood, there was a high rate of unexplained illnesses, miscarriages, and intellectual disability. Basements were often covered with a thick, black substance, and vegetation was dying.  In many yards, the only vegetation that grew were shrubby grasses. Although city officials were asked to investigate the area, they did not act to solve the problem. Niagara Falls mayor Michael O'Laughlin infamously stated that there was "nothing wrong" in Love Canal.

With further investigation, Gibbs discovered the chemical danger of the adjacent canal. This began her organization's two-year effort to demonstrate that the waste buried by Hooker Chemical was responsible for the health problems of local residents. Throughout the ordeal, homeowners' concerns were ignored not only by Hooker Chemical (now a subsidiary of Occidental Petroleum), but also by members of government. These parties argued that the area's endemic health problems were unrelated to the toxic chemicals buried in the Canal. Since the residents could not prove the chemicals on their property had come from Hooker's disposal site, they could not prove liability. Throughout the legal battle, residents were unable to sell their properties and relocate.

Federal response 
On August 7, 1978, United States President Jimmy Carter announced a federal health emergency, called for the allocation of federal funds, and ordered the Federal Disaster Assistance Agency to assist the City of Niagara Falls to remedy the Love Canal site. This was the first time in American history that emergency funds were used for a situation other than a natural disaster.  Carter had trenches built that would transport the wastes to sewers and had home sump pumps sealed off.

Congress passed the Comprehensive Environmental Response, Compensation, and Liability Act (CERCLA), better known as the Superfund Act. Love Canal became the first entry on the list. CERCLA created a tax on the chemical and petroleum industries and provided broad Federal authority to respond directly to releases or threatened releases of hazardous substances that may endanger public health or the environment. CERCLA also created a National Priorities List, a shortened list of the sites that has priority in cleanup. Love Canal was the first Superfund site on that list. Eventually, the site was cleaned and deleted off the list in 2004. Because the Superfund Act contained a "retroactive liability" provision, Occidental was held liable for cleanup of the waste even though it had followed all applicable U.S. laws when disposing of it.

Aftermath 

When Eckhardt C. Beck (EPA Administrator for Region 2, 1977–1979) visited Love Canal during the late 1970s, he discerned the presence of toxic substances in the community:

Robert Whalen, then-New York's Health Commissioner, also visited Love Canal and believed that the Canal constituted an emergency, stating: "Love Canal Chemical Waste Landfill constitutes a public nuisance and an extremely serious threat and danger to the health, safety and welfare of those using it, living near it or exposed to the conditions emanating from it, consisting among other things, of chemical wastes lying exposed on the surface in numerous places pervasive, pernicious and obnoxious chemical vapors and fumes affecting both the ambient air and the homes of certain residents living near such sites." Whalen also instructed people to avoid going into their basements as well as to avoid fruits and vegetables grown in their gardens.  People became very worried because many had consumed produce from their gardens for several years. Whalen urged that all pregnant women and children under the age of two be removed from Love Canal as soon as possible.

The 99th Street School, on the other hand, was located within the former boundary of the Hooker Chemical landfill site. The school was closed and demolished, but both the school board and the chemical company refused to accept liability. The 93rd Street School was closed some two years later because of concerns about seeping toxic waste.

Evacuation 
The lack of public interest in Love Canal made matters worse for the homeowners' association, which was opposed by two organizations that sought to disprove negligence. Initially, members of the association had been frustrated by the lack of a public entity that could advise and defend them. Gibbs met with public resistance from a number of residents within the community. Eventually, the federal government relocated more than 800 families and reimbursed them for the loss of their homes. The state government and federal government used $15 million to purchase 400 homes closest to Love Canal and demolished several rings of houses.

Litigation and compensation 
In 1994, Federal District Judge John Curtin ruled that Hooker/Occidental had been negligent, but not reckless, in its handling of the waste and sale of the land to the Niagara Falls School Board. Curtin's decision also contains a detailed history of events leading up to the Love Canal disaster. Occidental Petroleum was sued by the EPA and in 1995 agreed to pay $129 million in restitution. Out of that federal lawsuit came money for a small health fund and $3.5 million for the state health study. Residents' lawsuits were also settled in the years following the Love Canal disaster.

The Department of Justice published a report noting that the sites have been successfully remediated and are ready again for use. The Love Canal Area Revitalization Authority sold a few abandoned homes to private citizens. Virtually all remedial activities of the site, other than the operation of the leachate collection system, were completed by 1989.

Remediation 

Houses in the residential areas on the east and west sides of the canal were demolished. All that remains on the west side are abandoned residential streets. Some older east side residents, whose houses stand alone in the demolished neighborhood, chose to stay. It was estimated that fewer than 90 of the original 900 families opted to remain. They were willing to remain as long as they were guaranteed that their homes were in a relatively safe area. On June 4, 1980, the state government founded the Love Canal Area Revitalization Agency (LCARA) to restore the area. The area north of Love Canal became known as Black Creek Village. LCARA wanted to resell 300 homes that had been bought by New York when the residents were relocated. The homes are farther away from where the chemicals were dumped. The most toxic area was reburied with a thick plastic liner, clay and dirt. It has been calculated that 248 separate chemicals, including  of dioxin, have been unearthed from the canal.

Analysis 
In 1998, Elizabeth Whelan, founder of industry advocacy group American Council on Science and Health, wrote an editorial about the Canal in which she stated that the media started calling the Canal a "public health time bomb", an editorial that created minor hysteria. She declared that people were not falling ill because of exposure to chemical waste, but from stress caused by the media.  Besides double the rate of birth defects to children born while living on Love Canal, a follow-up study two decades after the incident "showed increased risks of low birth weight, congenital malformations and other adverse reproductive events".

Love Canal, along with Times Beach, Missouri and the Valley of the Drums, Kentucky, are important in United States environmental history as three sites that significantly contributed to the passing of the CERCLA. Love Canal "become the symbol for what happens when hazardous industrial products are not confined to the workplace but 'hit people where they live' in inestimable amounts".

Love Canal was not an isolated case. Eckardt C. Beck suggested that there are probably hundreds of similar dumpsites. President Carter declared that discovering these dumpsites was "one of the grimmest discoveries of the modern era". Had the residents of Love Canal been aware that they were residing on toxic chemicals, most would not have moved there in the first place. Beck noted that one main problem remains that ownership of such chemical companies can change over the years, making liability difficult to assign (a problem that would be addressed by CERCLA, or the Superfund Act).  Beck contended that increased commitment was necessary to develop controls that would "defuse future Love Canals".

Some free market environmentalist activists have cited the Love Canal incident as a consequence of government decision-makers not taking responsibility for their decisions. Stroup writes, "The school district owning the land had a laudable but narrow goal: it wanted to provide education cheaply for district children. Government decision makers are seldom held accountable for broader social goals in the way that private owners are by liability rules and potential profits."

Conclusion
In 2004, federal officials announced that the Superfund cleanup has ended, although cleanup had concluded years prior. The entire process occurred over 21 years and cost a total of $400 million. In total, 950 families had been evacuated. The site was removed from the Superfund list on September 30, 2004.

Controversies related to moved Love Canal waste and reports of illness 
Residents of North Tonawanda and Wheatfield suffering severe health problems say the waste was subsequently disturbed during the construction of the LaSalle Expressway in Niagara Falls. The New York Department of Environmental Conservation (DEC) contends there is no proof the landfill leaks. A lawsuit asserts that Hooker's creation of a brine pipeline along the edge of the landfill used to move brine from Wyoming County to its Niagara Falls plant location, may have created a conduit for the landfilled waste to leak out.

In popular culture 
 
The legacy of the disaster inspired a fictionalized 1982 made-for-TV film titled Lois Gibbs and the Love Canal. An award-winning documentary by Lynn Corcoran titled In Our Own Backyard was released in the U.S. in 1983. Modern Marvels retold the disaster in 2004.

Joyce Carol Oates included the story of Love Canal in her 2004 novel The Falls, but changed the time period of the disaster to the 1960s. The latest history of Love Canal is Paradise Falls: The True Story of an Environmental Catastrophe, written by journalist Keith O’Brien, published by Pantheon in 2022.

The film Tootsie has a character (played by Bill Murray) attempting to produce a play called "Return to Love Canal". In response to the pitch for the play, Sydney Pollack tells Dustin Hoffman that "Nobody wants to produce a play about a couple that moved back to Love Canal. Nobody wants to pay twenty dollars to see people living next to chemical waste. They can see that in New Jersey."

"Love Canal" was also a segment in the premiere episode of Michael Moore's television series TV Nation, which featured realtors attempting to lure prospective residents to the area.

"Love Canal" is the name of a 7" single released by the noise-punk band Flipper in February 1981. The lyrics are about the disaster.

In the 2000 film Erin Brockovich, when legal counsel Ed Masry holds a town meeting to discuss arbitration in the case of Hinkley groundwater contamination by Pacific Gas and Electric, the townsfolk are reluctant to agree. When they turn on the idea, Masry brings up Love Canal, as an example where going to trial would be more time-consuming and difficult, explaining that many plaintiffs still had open cases being settled or appealed. When the film was set, in 1993, litigation for Love Canal was still ongoing, despite coming to public and government attention in the late 1970s.

See also 
 102nd Street chemical landfill, a landfill located immediately to the south of Love Canal.
 Cancer Alley (in Louisiana)
 Mossville, Louisiana
 Landfills in the United States
 Spring Valley, Washington, D.C.
 Times Beach, Missouri
 Valley of the Drums
 Centralia, Pennsylvania and its mine fire
 William Ginsberg, member of New York State task force investigating Love Canal in 1979, and author of state report.
 The Killing Ground

References

Bibliography

 Google books

 Google books

External links 

 Love Canal Collections in the University Archives, University at Buffalo Libraries
 Adeline Levine Love Canal Papers: An inventory at EmpireADC.org, courtesy of the Buffalo History Museum
 Love Canal Medical Fund, Inc.
 New York Heritage: Love Canal Images
2008 Follow Up Study

 
Canals in New York (state)
Disasters in New York (state)
Environmental issues in New York (state)
Environmental controversies
Environmental disasters in the United States
Forcibly depopulated communities in the United States
Health disasters in the United States
Former landfills in the United States
Neighborhoods in Niagara Falls, New York
Pollution in the United States
Superfund sites in New York (state)
Waste disposal incidents in the United States
Environmental disaster ghost towns
1976 in the environment
1978 in the environment
Urban decay in the United States